Durham High School is a former high school in Durham, North Carolina, United States.  Their school colors were Maroon & White and their mascot was the Bulldogs.

History  
Central High School, located on Morris Street, opened in 1906 and served Durham city's white high school students until 1922. This building then was converted to Durham's City Hall, and is now the home of the Durham Arts Council. Durham High School replaced Central High School in 1922, on property that once belonged to Brodie L. Duke.

During racial segregation, Durham High School was a high school for whites in the city of Durham. The high school for African Americans was Hillside High School. In 1959, Durham High School began integration under then Superintendent of Schools, Lew W. Hannen. In 1959–60 African Americans Joycelyn McKissick, a senior, and Claudette Brame, a junior, enrolled.

Located next to Durham High School, was Central Junior High School, which opened in 1926. The building was later renamed Julian S. Carr Junior High School in 1945. The junior high became part of the Durham High School campus in the fall of 1975, when the school district expanded high schools to include grade 9. (Prior to that year, Durham junior highs included grades 7–9 and high schools served grades 10–12.)

By the 1980s, Durham High School was no longer a majority white school.

In 1992, the Durham City and County School Districts merged to become Durham Public Schools. Durham High School would close as a traditional high school in 1995. In 1995, Durham Magnet Center for Visual and Performing Arts opened, and was later renamed Durham School of the Arts. The former Durham High School campus now makes up part of the Durham School of the Arts campus, along with the site of the former Carr Middle School. The former Durham High School auto shop, is now Durham School of the Art's Black Box Theatre.

Athletics
Durham High's football team won five state championships between 1938 and 1945, under Coach Cary Brewbaker. By the 1970s, the Bulldog football program built another powerhouse under Hal Stewart, and later under James "Bump" Elliott, during the late 1970s and early 1980s.

Durham High was also well known for its basketball program as well. Durham High led North Carolina in most Men's Basketball State Championships with 13, before New Hanover High School surpassed them. During a three-year period, from 1937 through 1940, under Coach Paul Sykes, Durham High's basketball team compiled a phenomenal record of 73 straight wins. Included in those wins, were championships in the Duke-Durham Invitational Tournament and the Eastern Interscholastic Tournament at Glens Falls, New York. Horace "Bones" McKinney, was the premier player during this three year undefeated span. The gymnasium at Durham High was later named for Coach Sykes.

In 1969, Dave Odom became Durham High's basketball coach. He was voted the league's coach of the year five times in his seven years there, later becoming a head coach at Wake Forest University.

Notable alumni 
 George V. Allen – United States diplomat
 Elmer Barbour – NFL blocking back and linebacker
 Isaac M. "Ike" Carpenter – jazz bandleader and pianist active in the 1940s and 1950s
 Nick Galifianakis – served as a U.S. Congressman from North Carolina
 Bob Gantt – professional basketball player
 David Gergen – political commentator and former presidential advisor
 George Watts Hill – banker, hospital administrator and philanthropist
 Louis Isaac Jaffe – journalist and Pulitzer Prize for Editorial Writing winner
 John D. Loudermilk – country singer and songwriter
 Loretta Lynch – served as the 83rd attorney general of the United States from 2015 to 2017
 Leo Mangum – MLB pitcher
 Charles Markham – served as the Mayor of Durham from 1981 to 1985
 Bones McKinney – former NBA player and coach
 Thom Mount – former president of Universal Pictures
 Don Schlitz – singer-songwriter and Country Music Hall of Fame inductee
 Ted G. Stone – Southern Baptist evangelist

References

External links

YouTube video of Rescue 911 chemistry teacher injury

Defunct schools in North Carolina
Durham Public Schools
Schools in Durham County, North Carolina